is a Japanese manga artist from Setouchi in Okayama Prefecture.

Works
 Akaboshi: Ibun Suikoden - part of anthology Weekly Shōnen Jump
 Cross Beat
 Live Alive
 Over Time - part of anthology Weekly Shōnen Jump
 Season Call
 Usagi to Kame to Strike
 Asobi mono
 Examurai (エグザムライ, Eguzamurai)
 Stealth Symphony (with Ryohgo Narita)
 Ana No Mujina
 Mist Gears Blast
Dragon Quest Treasures: Another Adventure Fadora no Takarajima

References

External links

 Yoichi Amano manga at Media Arts Database 

1981 births
Living people
Manga artists from Okayama Prefecture
People from Okayama